Adam David Block (born 1973) is an American astrophotographer, astronomy researcher, writer and instructor.

Biography 
Block grew up in Rhode Island and Georgia, moving west in 1991 to attend the University of Arizona. In 1996, he earned his B.S. degree in Astronomy and Physics. After graduation, he was employed by the National Optical Astronomy Observatory for its public outreach program on Kitt Peak, which he did for nine years. In 2007 he founded the Mount Lemmon SkyCenter for the University of Arizona, which offers public stargazing programs as well as specialized programs in astrophotography. From 2016 on, he has continued work at Steward Observatory, the research arm of the Department of Astronomy at the University of Arizona. Much of his current work concerns characterizing the night sky and space domain awareness.

Astrophotographer 
From the age of 13, Block has been an avid astrophotographer. His images and techniques have been featured in Astronomy Magazine, Sky & Telescope, National Geographic, Scientific American and L'Astronomie. Many have been used by space-based observatories as references for ground-based broadband images of objects. NASA has used Block's images over 90 times as Astronomy Picture of the Day.

Block describes himself as a popularizer of astronomy through public outreach, but that "... astrophotography has much greater reach since the images I create can be seen by people around the world.” At the 2012 Advanced Imaging Conference, he received the annual Hubble Award for special contributions to the field of astroimaging. 

The Minor Planet Center credits Block with the discovery of asteroid 45298 Williamon, made on January 5, 2000. He also has an asteroid named for him, 172525 Adamblock.

Block also discovered stellar tidal star streams associated with NGC 3614 in February of 2015.

Block offers instruction in astrophotography and techniques of image processing, both through magazine articles and personally through his online studios.

Gallery 
Images by Adam Block, Mount Lemmon SkyCenter.

References

External links 
 Adam Block Photos
 Adam Block Studios - Instruction in Astrophotography
 Astrophotographer: Adam Block (YouTube video)
 Mount Lemmon SkyCenter
 NOIRLab

1973 births
Living people
American astronomers
Astrophotographers
University of Arizona alumni